The Ministry of Finance of Lesotho is responsible for the public finances of Lesotho.

Ministers of Finance
Benedict Leseteli, 1965-1967
Peete Nkuebe Peete, 1967-1971
Evaristus Sekhonyana, 1971-1981
Khetla Rakhetla, 1981-1985
Peete Nkuebe Peete, 1986
Evaristus Sekhonyana, 1986-1991
Abel Leshele Thoahlane, 1991-1994
Moeketsi Senaoana, 1995-1996
Victor Ketso, 1996-1999
Kelebone Albert Maope, 1999-2001
Mohlabi Tsekoa, 2001-2002
Timothy Thahane, 2002-2012
Victor Ketso, 2012-2015
'Mamphono Khaketla, 2015-2017
Moeketsi Majoro, 2017-2020
Thabo Sophonea, 2020-

References

See also 
 Finance ministry
 Economy of Lesotho
 Politics of Lesotho

Lesotho
Government of Lesotho